Ahat, also known as AXAT ("agate"), is a Bulgarian rock band from Sofia.

History 
The band was created in 1986 in Sofia by students from the National Academy of Music and the University of Chemical Technology and Metallurgy. Their first live performance was on December 22, 1986.

In 1989 the band went to North Korea with the Bulgarian delegation to the World Youth and Student Festival, which has brought them criticism as being too close to the Communist regime. The same year Ahat released their first album  (The March). It is regarded as their most successful album. The most popular songs from it are: "The Black Sheep", "Land Of Blindmen", "The Tree", "Fiery Souls", "The March". They also received their first music award and had a successful tour with Shturcite. The following year, they appeared on the compilation "21st Youth Pop Song Contest" with the song "Deviz" (Девиз, Motto).

In 1994 the band released their second album  (From Underneath the Ruins). The album is a compilation of the band's hits, a couple of songs recorded for compilations and 5 English-language songs recorded in 1991. Notable songs from this album are "Monologue" and the English version of "The Tree". After a period of inactivity, the band had a notable return being the opening band for the first Deep Purple concert in Bulgaria in 1998. The next year, the band released their first live album  (7 Years Later).

On May 19, 2004 the band released their third album, Made in USA. According to the publishers the album is the biggest investment made by a Bulgarian musical producer.

Golden Rock Tour 2004 is the band's second live album recorded during their impressive national tour in 2004 and released in 2007. In 2009, they released a single called "Tam" (Там, There).

Members

Current members 
 Zvezdomir Keremedchiev – vocals
 Antoan Hadad – guitars
 Denis Rizov – bass guitars
 Antoni Georgiev – keyboards
 Yuri Kocev – drums

Former members 
 Bojidar Glavev – guitar
 Ivailo Petrov – bass guitar

Discography 
  (1989)
  (1994)
  (live) (1999)
 Made in USA (2004)
 Golden Rock Tour 2004 (live) (2007)
 1986-2013 (2015) (compilation of non-album singles and compilation tracks)

References

External links 
 The official band site.
 Encyclopaedia Metallum Page.
 Interview with Denis (Bulgarian).
 Ahat at Bulgarian Rock Archives

Bulgarian rock music groups
1986 establishments in Bulgaria
Musical groups established in 1986
Culture in Sofia